Console user interface may refer to:
 Command-line interface, user interface using only text
 Text-based user interface, user interface with simple text-based menus and dialogues

User interfaces